"I'm Not Missing You" is a song written by Keir "KayGee" Gist, Terence "Tramp Baby" Abney, Esteban Crandle, Tawanna Dabney, Balewa Muhammad and Orrico herself for Stacie Orrico's third studio album Beautiful Awakening. It was co-produced by KayGee and Terence "Tramp Baby" Abney. "I'm Not Missing You" was released as the album's first single in North America on October 3, 2006, and internationally in August 2006.

Song information 

The song was produced by KayGee (formerly of Naughty by Nature) and Terence "Tramp Baby" Abney of Divine Mill known for their work in the R&B genre with acts like Next and Jaheim. The single was released as a download on June 6 and was played on radio from June 20 (it only appeared on the Bubbling Under Hot 100) and was re-released on October 3. The song received airplay on the radio (especially in the UK) and was released there on August 21, 2006, giving Orrico her fifth Top 40 UK hit.

Music video 

The video was directed by known video director Diane Martel. It was filmed on May 31 and June 1. The video basically illustrates Stacie's struggle to get control from her boyfriend. The week the "I'm Not Missing You" video was released in the UK, it shot straight to No. 2 in the UK TV airplay chart, becoming the second most played video of the week there.

Stacie re-shot the video for release in the US and Canada. It was directed by the husband-wife directing team Honey. It was estimated to have been filmed in Los Angeles on October 26 and 27. The redone video is about Stacie's being happy about not being attached to anyone. Unlike the original version all of Stacie's wardrobe was provided by herself. The video premiered on Yahoo! Music on December 6.

Track listings

Charts

Weekly charts

Year-end charts

References 

2006 singles
2006 songs
Music videos directed by Diane Martel
Songs written by Balewa Muhammad
Songs written by Stacie Orrico
Stacie Orrico songs
Virgin Records singles
Songs written by KayGee